Attila Kun (also known as Attila Kun II; born 9 March 1949) is a Romanian former professional footballer of Hungarian ethnicity and currently manager of FC 09 Überlingen (youth). He is considered one of the best players that ever played for Bihor Oradea, with over 300 matches played and over 100 goals scored.

Career 
He also played for UTA Arad in 103 matches and scored 35 goals. After retirement Kun started his football manager career at Bihor Oradea and in the middle of the 80's he moved in Germany where Attila coached lower league and youth teams.

Attila Kun played in 17 matches and scored 3 goals for Romania, being one of the few players selected for national team even when he was playing in the second league.

References

External links
 
 

1949 births
Living people
Sportspeople from Oradea
Romanian sportspeople of Hungarian descent
Romanian footballers
Association football forwards
Liga I players
Liga II players
FC Bihor Oradea players
FC UTA Arad players
Romanian football managers
FC Bihor Oradea managers
Romanian expatriate sportspeople in West Germany
Expatriate football managers in West Germany
Olympic footballers of Romania
Romania international footballers
Romanian expatriate sportspeople in Germany
Expatriate football managers in Germany